"Blue Bayou" is a song written by Roy Orbison and Joe Melson. It was  originally sung and recorded by Orbison, who had an international hit with his version in 1963. It later became Linda Ronstadt's signature song, with which she scored a Top 5 hit with her cover in 1977. The song has since been recorded by many others.

Roy Orbison version

Background
"Blue Bayou" was originally recorded by Roy Orbison at the end of 1961. In the UK, it was released by London Monument as the double A-side track with "Mean Woman Blues" on a Monument Records single (HLU 9777), where both sides peaked at number 3. In the US, it was issued as a B-side single, peaking at number 29; the A-side, "Mean Woman Blues", peaked at number 5. The song also appeared on Orbison's 1963 full-length album In Dreams. According to the authorised biography of Roy Orbison, a rare different version of "Blue Bayou" was released only in Italy (London 45-HL 1499).

"Blue Bayou" reappeared on his 1989 posthumous album A Black & White Night Live, from the 1988 television special on Cinemax.

Track listings

7" vinyl
US: Monument Records 824

Side one
 "Blue Bayou" (Roy Orbison, Joe Melson) – 2:29 – Recorded in late 1961.
Side two
 "Mean Woman Blues" (Claude Demetrius) – 2:23

Chart performance

Weekly charts

Year-end charts

References in popular culture
This song has been used in several motion pictures including:
 The Man Who Fell to Earth (1976), starring David Bowie, directed by Nicolas Roeg
 Last Orders (2001), directed by Fred Schepisi
 Dreamcatcher (2003), directed by Lawrence Kasdan
 Man on Fire (2004), directed by Tony Scott
 The Best of Enemies (2019), directed by Robin Bissell, and starring Taraji P. Henson and Sam Rockwell
 Blue Bayou (film) (2021), directed by Justin Chon. In the film the song is sung by actress Alicia Vikander
Jacques Cousteau included an abridged version of the song during a "River Explorations" episode which details environmental changes on the Mississippi River.
This song has also been used in the Netflix digital series, Stranger Things (Season 2, Episode 6).

Linda Ronstadt version

Background
Linda Ronstadt took the song to #3 on the Billboard Hot 100 in late 1977, where it held for four weeks, as well as #2 Country and #3 Easy Listening.  It also reached #2, holding there for four weeks, on the Cash Box Top 100 chart.

The single was RIAA certified Gold (for sales of over 1 million US copies) in January 1978. It was the first of Ronstadt's three Gold singles. Don Henley of the Eagles sang backup on the recording.  "Blue Bayou" was later certified Platinum (for over 2 million copies sold in the United States). It was a worldwide smash, charting in countries such as Australia, Canada, New Zealand, the United Kingdom, and specially in Mexico, where it topped the singles charts.

Ronstadt's version was nominated for the Grammy Award for Record of the Year and for Best Female Pop Vocal Performance.

Ronstadt also recorded a Spanish-language version of the song, titled "Lago Azul (Blue Bayou)", which was released in 1978 on the single Asylum E-45464, backed by "Lo Siento Mi Vida", a previously released Spanish song that Ronstadt herself co-wrote. This version has never been included on any reissues of Simple Dreams.

Ronstadt later performed the song on the episode 523 of The Muppet Show, first aired October 26, 1980 on UK, and May 16, 1981 on United States.

Because of this song, Dickson's Baseball Dictionary records that a "Linda Ronstadt" is a synonym for a fastball, a pitch that "blew by you".  That phrase was coined by Mets broadcaster Tim McCarver, during a Mets telecast in the 1980s.

Ronstadt's version appears, in edited form, in the 2017 film American Made and in Tony Scott's 2004 film Man on Fire.

Track listings

7" vinyl
US: Asylum Records E-45431

Side one
 "Blue Bayou" (Roy Orbison, Joe Melson) – 3:57
Side two
 "Old Paint (traditional, arranged by Linda Ronstadt) – 3:05

Chart performance

Weekly charts

Year-end charts

Certifications

See also
List of number-one hits of 1978 (Mexico)

References

External links
 
 

1963 singles
1977 singles
Roy Orbison songs
Linda Ronstadt songs
Monument Records singles
Asylum Records singles
Number-one singles in Australia
Irish Singles Chart number-one singles
The Muppets songs
Schlager songs
Songs written by Roy Orbison
Songs written by Joe Melson
1961 songs
Song recordings produced by Fred Foster
Number-one singles in Mexico